A Virgin Among the Living Dead is a 1973 European erotic horror film directed by Jesús Franco. Franco shot the film in 1971, but it was only released in 1973 after some additional erotic footage was added to the film without Franco's involvement. It was later re-cut with some extra zombie footage and redistributed to theaters again in 1981 as a zombie film. It has since been restored on DVD to Franco's original director's cut.

Plot
A beautiful young woman named Christina arrives in Europe to visit her estranged relatives in a small castle for the reading of her dead father's will. She eventually discovers that they are all undead, and they fear that when she inherits her father's mansion, she will ask them all to leave. But Christina is lonely and tells her Uncle Howard that she wants them all to remain there and live with her. She learns that a spirit called the Queen of the Night has claimed her father's eternal soul because he committed suicide by hanging himself. Christina winds up becoming one of the living dead herself, and at the end of the film, she and the rest of the family all solemnly march off into a swamp on the estate's grounds, accompanied by the Queen of the Night.

Cast

Production
Franco shot the film in 1971 in Portugal, where he said he had the full cooperation of the local authorities, and total license to film the outdoor nude scenes. Franco stated in interviews that this was one of his favorite films because he felt the plot was "so imaginative and interesting", the actors were so enthusiastic to work with him and it was made at a very happy time in his life. Franco himself played a co-starring role in this film as a mindless cretin named Basilio who walks the corridors talking in gibberish to a severed chicken's head. Franco's then-wife Nicole Guettard had a small role in the film's framing sequence as a nurse

According to Franco, the original shooting title of his film was The Night of the Shooting Stars (La nuit des étoiles filantes), the title he always preferred. It was released in France, however, in 1973 as Christina, Princess of Eroticism, and in Italy in 1978 as The Erotic Dreams of Christine; both versions contained new porn inserts directed by Pierre Querut at the behest of Comptoir Francais, featuring Alice Arno wearing a mask and leading three couples to have sex in an outdoor setting, added to the film without Franco's consent. Franco was not involved in filming the padded sex scenes. This x-rated version ran 90 minutes due to the added Alice Arno footage.

In 1981, producer Marius Lesoeur hired French horror film director Jean Rollin to direct some newly filmed zombie footage that was added to Franco's film for its 1981 re-release, under the new title A Virgin Among the Living Dead. At this time, the English dubbing was also recorded, the Alice Arno porn footage was cut out, and the film was released on VHS.

The film was released years later on DVD with the 1981 Jean Rollin zombie footage removed and the film finally restored to the way Franco originally shot it, but the film's title on the DVD remained A Virgin Among the Living Dead, a title which Franco abhorred.

Home media
The film was first released on VHS in the United States as A Virgin Among the Living Dead by Wizard Video (the 1981 re-release with the added Rollin zombie footage included.)

The film was released the same way on DVD in the United States by Image Entertainment in 2003 as part of their EuroShock horror line.

On August 20, 2013, a Blu-ray edition, containing Franco's original director's cut, was made available by Redemption. Rollin's zombie footage is on the disc as well as an extra feature separate from the film.

Alternative titles include: A comme apocalypse; Among the Living Dead; Christina chez les morts vivants; Christina, princesse de l'erotisme; Christina, Sex Princess;  La nuit des etoiles filantes; Los suenos eroticos de Christine; and Zombie 4

Reception
Richard Whittaker of The Austin Chronicle called it "one of the most infamously mutilated underground favorites", and said the original Franco version is the best cut of the film.  Chris Alexander of Fangoria called the original Franco cut "a loose, atmospheric masterpiece of pure cinema".  Gordon Sullivan of DVD Verdict wrote that the Kino-Redemption release is "a triumph for Franco fans, though unlikely to appeal outside that demographic".  Bill Gibron of DVD Talk rated it 3.5 out of 5 stars, calling it "a truly unnerving experience representing Franco at his most visually arresting".  Writing in The Zombie Movie Encyclopedia, academic Peter Dendle called it "an atrophied psychological horror, which is over-stylish and impressionistic to the point of incoherence".

See also
List of zombie films
 List of mainstream movies with unsimulated sex

References

External links
 

1973 films
1973 horror films
Erotic horror films
Films set in castles
French erotic films
French zombie films
Spanish erotic films
Spanish zombie films
1970s French-language films
Spanish supernatural horror films
French supernatural horror films
Films directed by Jesús Franco
Films scored by Bruno Nicolai
Films shot in Portugal
1970s French films